The Germany–Netherlands football rivalry is one of the few longstanding football rivalries at a national level. Beginning in 1974 when the Dutch lost the 1974 FIFA World Cup to West Germany in the final (though deeply rooted in Dutch anti-German sentiment due to the German occupation of the Netherlands during World War II), the rivalry between the two nations has become one of the best known international football rivalries in the world.

Both football nations have been among the top ranked according to the strongest football nations by Elo Ratings, and have met a total of 45 times (of which 14 matches were competitive) which resulted in 16 victories for Germany, 17 draws, and 12 victories for the Netherlands.

History

1974–88
For the Dutch, the origins of the rivalry are primarily based on the anti-German sentiment resulting from World War II in which, during a five-year German occupation, a quarter of a million Dutch people died and the country itself was devastated. In particular, matches up until 1988 show a strong emotional connection between war experiences alongside the sportive element among the Dutch, but this inevitably lessened with the passage of time.

When Germany and the Netherlands met in the final of the 1974 FIFA World Cup (which was also their first competitive match since 1945) the Dutch, despite being strong favourites, lost to the Germans which resulted in a national trauma which is poetically referred to as "De moeder aller nederlagen" ("The mother of all defeats") in Dutch. NOS sports commentator Herman Kuiphof's remark on air after the winning goal was scored – "We are fooled yet again" – became a catchphrase.

The loss of the 1974 final was a source of great bitterness among the Dutch and it would not be until 1988, when the Dutch beat the Germans in their own country and went on to become the new European Champions, that the public pressure on the Dutch team to be successful relaxed somewhat. The two competitive matches which would take place between 1974 and 1988 – in the group stages at the 1978 FIFA World Cup and UEFA Euro 1980 – were notoriously aggressive, and created a lot of pressure on both sides. The 1980 match would see Toni Schumacher and Huub Stevens fighting on field, whereas René van de Kerkhof would go on to punch Bernd Schuster in the eye.

During the semi-final of UEFA Euro 1988, the Dutch defeated Germany (the host country) 2–1 with a goal by Marco van Basten in the last minute. After the game Ronald Koeman of the Dutch team pretended to wipe his backside with Olaf Thon's jersey, creating outrage in Germany.

The Dutch proceeded to win the final against the Soviet Union. When the team returned to the Netherlands and celebrated in the capital Amsterdam, Head coach Rinus Michels stood in front of the Dutch Royal Palace and said to the crowd: "We won the tournament, but we all know that the semi-final was the real final". The Netherlands exploded into a mass celebration. As the Dutch team returned home they were paraded through the canals of Amsterdam as people jumped in the water and swam towards the players to congratulate them.

Following the 1988 match, anti-German sentiment became much less prominent among the Dutch, as defeating the Germans and going on to win the cup, in Germany itself, was to many the closest they would ever come to repaying Germany. It also marked a new phase in the rivalry because with the war-related sentiment lessened on the Dutch side, the Germans now as a consequence also became far more vocal about the football rivalry, which they had avoided previously. The rivalry continued, but the tone (though still highly competitive) became less aggressive.

1988–2012
In 1990 both teams met again during the second round of the World Cup. This match is seen as the main catalyst for the modern rivalry, in which both Germany and the Netherlands enthusiastically participate. The teams had also met in the qualification round for this World Cup: 0–0 in Germany and 1–1 in The Netherlands.

Before kick-off, the Dutch supporters shouted down the Deutschlandlied with boos and the Germans replied by chanting "Deutschland! Deutschland!" during the playing of Het Wilhelmus. The game that followed was notable for its many fouls and other incidents. After Rudi Völler had been hacked down by Frank Rijkaard, who was subsequently booked, Rijkaard spat in Völler's hair. After the following free kick, Völler and the Dutch keeper Van Breukelen had contact, both trying to get the ball, and Van Breukelen and Rijkaard shouted at Völler and Rijkaard pulled Völler's hair. The referee sent both Rijkaard and Völler off, and Rijkaard spat in Völler's hair a second time when both players left the pitch. Germany won the match 2–1 and went on to win the tournament and become World Champions.

In 1992 the Dutch beat Germany 3–1 during the group stage of the European Championship. However, both teams progressed. The Netherlands would go on to lose the semi-finals against Denmark, who then defeated Germany in the final.

The next competitive match between the two nations came at UEFA Euro 2004 in Portugal. The result was a 1–1 draw, with the Netherlands progressing to the knockout stages and Germany failing to do so.

Their next competitive fixture was in the group stages of UEFA Euro 2012. The match assumed greater significance after the results of the first tranche of group matches were completed (Denmark defeating the Dutch and Germany defeating Portugal both by 1-0), since it was possible that a German win could eliminate the Dutch from the tournament, depending on the result of the other subsequent game in Group B (between Denmark and Portugal); although Portugal defeated Denmark 3-2 to keep both them and the Dutch alive, Germany vs Netherlands ended in a 2–1 victory to Germany, putting the Netherlands' progression from the group stage into significant doubt. The Dutch were eliminated with no points after losing to Portugal in their last match; Germany lost in the semi-finals. After a friendly in Amsterdam in November 2012, the teams would not meet again for almost six years.

2018–present
The stage was set for another chapter in the rivalry during the 2018–19 and the 2019–20 seasons, as the Netherlands and Germany were drawn together in a group for both the inaugural UEFA Nations League and the UEFA Euro 2020 qualifiers. The first of the two Nations League matches, in October 2018, was won 3–0 by the Dutch despite the Germans having the upper hand. In the return match in November 2018, two late goals from Quincy Promes and Virgil van Dijk got the Netherlands a 2–2 draw, as a consequence securing the group win for the Dutch and relegation for the Germans (though that was later reversed due to an overhaul of the Nations League rules). In the Euro 2020 fixtures in March 2019, Germany bounced back by winning 2–3 in Amsterdam through a 90th minute goal from Nico Schulz; in September 2019, the Netherlands won convincingly by 2–4 in Hamburg, the first Dutch away win since 2002.

Overall balance and friendlies
Overall, the matches between both countries have been quite balanced in the past decades, including the latest friendlies. Since 1996 the friendly matches in The Netherlands resulted in one Dutch victory (2–1 in 2000), two draws (2–2 in 2005; 0–0 in 2012) and one defeat (0–1 in 1996). The friendly matches in Germany resulted in one Germany victory (3–0 in 2011), one draw (1–1 in 1998) and one Dutch victory (1–3 in 2002).

The teams were scheduled to play on 17 November 2015 in Hannover, but serious threats with connections to the Paris terror attacks which occurred during a Germany-France match, led German authorities to cancel the friendly. German authorities had evidence of a planned attack outside the stadium as well as in the Hannover Hauptbahnhof. The HDI-Arena was evacuated 2 hours before the match was scheduled to begin.

Major tournament matches

Other competitive matches

List of matches

Statistics

Overall record
Includes matches involving former West Germany
 Total number of games: 45
 Germany wins: 16
 Draws: 17
 Netherlands wins: 12

Overall

In popular culture

Newspapers 
After the German national team were eliminated from the 2010 FIFA World Cup, the German tabloid Bild suggested that Germans should now support the Dutch team (which they referred to as "Bundesrepublik Holland") because a number of Dutch players played for German clubs, mainly FC Bayern Munich. The article was subsequently picked up by several Dutch newspapers and was met with disdain and ridicule, De Telegraaf opening with "When lacking own talent ..." when discussing the Bild article.

Museums 
The Dutch Voetbal Experience museum in Roosendaal has one of its 18 permanent exhibitions dedicated to the German-Dutch football rivalry, with tours available in Dutch, German and English. A Dutch poem on the 1974 defeat called 'De moeder aller nederlagen' can be found on the museum wall. The last line reads `Wij waren de beste, maar zij waren beter´ ('We were the best, but they were better').

Television 
In the 2006 World Cup documentary Deutschland. Ein Sommermärchen, the early elimination of the Dutch team is illustrated by showing an Autobahn sign "Netherlands, exit right". In an episode of the Dutch history series Andere Tijden on the 1988 European Championship, which the Dutch won, a shot can be seen of an overpass near the Dutch-German border which reads, in German, "You are now entering the country of the European Champions". In a 2010 episode of Voetbal Inside, a Dutch football show, a clip is shown in which people are being interviewed on the streets and asked what they think the Dutch team should do in order to win the 2010 FIFA World Cup. After a while a (Dutch) man is shown who happily declares his "complete support" for the German national team, after which the clip stops and the presenters of the show are shown laughing uncontrollably.

Advertisements 
During the 1990s and 2000s a lot of adverts appeared, at first on Dutch television later also on German networks, which referenced the Dutch-German football rivalry, including:
 A Sport Select ad, in which a Dutch couple in a caravan overtakes an elderly German woman, after which both cars start ramming each other.
 A Heineken ad, in which a mock press conference is given by a German official who presents earplugs as the 'ultimate weapon' against a string of Dutch fan noisemakers.
 A NUON ad, in which a Dutch fan accidentally spills his drink on a German fan, ruining his T-shirt. The Dutch fan then offers his own (black) shirt to the German as a compensation, which the German fan accepts. During the match the German is cheering violently, turning his shirt (being sensitive to body heat) orange.
 A Histor (Dutch paint brand) ad, in which a British 'wall whisperer' (Barrie Hall) concludes that the walls in the South African 2010 FIFA World Cup stadiums (all painted orange) are 'happy'. As he leaves it is revealed the room painted belongs to the German National Team.
 A Sportwetten (German betting site) ad, in which a German and a Dutch fan walk past each other and the German fan spits in the Dutchmans hair. This was based on the notorious attack on Rudi Völler by Frank Rijkaard at the 1990 World Cup.
 In 2000, a Dutch TV commercial, in reference to the infamous spitting incident, shows Völler and Rijkaard both wearing bathrobes, having breakfast together, suggesting the taste of butter is so good it gets the world's most bitter rivals together. Rijkaard later declared in an interview that both he and Völler decided to be part of the commercial considering 10 years had passed since the incident and it was time to bury the hatchet.
 A Bosch ad, in which a German couple is overtaken by a car full of Dutch fans who mock him. The German keeps up with the Dutch car, but then suddenly breaks off. The Dutch fans celebrate only to be caught in a speed trap.
 A 2006 EA Games ad for a football computer game, in which (animated) Dutch players and fans are celebrating victory, followed by a dramatic voice from the off claiming: "Holland will win the World Cup... Only you can stop them!" After that, the German team is shown scoring against the Dutch.
 Also in 2006, in the wake of the World Cup being hosted by Germany, a commercial showed Oliver Kahn and Michael Ballack decorating a dressing room for the Brazil national team (poking fun at Germany's previous loss to Brazil in the final of the 2002 World Cup). At the end of the commercial, Ballack is seen holding a bouquet of orange tulips, reminding Kahn that they have yet to prepare the dressing room of the Dutch national team. The commercial added a more friendly perspective on the football rivalry between both teams.

Music 
A number of novelty songs have also been written, these include:

 "Wir sind die Holländer" by De Toppers. A 2006 song, sung partly in mock German.
 "Orange trägt nur die Müllabfuhr" by Mickie Krause. A 2008 song, the title of which means "only the garbage collector wears orange" in German, orange being the Dutch national colour. Waste collectors in the largest cities of Germany (such as Berlin, Hamburg and Frankfurt) do typically wear fluorescent orange overalls. However the insult is largely lost in translation as in the Netherlands garbage men wear yellow. The song is based on the melody of the Song Go West.
 "Holland" by Joint Venture. A 2002 song, about a singer who likes the Netherlands, the Dutch, and Dutch culture except when it comes to football.
 "Ohne Holland fahr'n wir zur WM" by the German band Orange Buh. A 2002 song about the Netherlands not passing World-Cup qualification. The title means "We're driving to the World Cup without Holland".
 "Schade, Deutschland, alles ist vorbei," meaning "Pity, Germany, it's all over," sung by Dutch fans after the Dutch team had reached the quarterfinals at the expense of the Germans at Euro 2004. The song has also been sung by the fans of other national teams – for example, by Danish fans during their 2–0 defeat of Germany in the UEFA Euro 1992 Final.

See also 
 England–Germany football rivalry
 German football rivalries
 Germany–Italy football rivalry
 List of football rivalries by country
 Low Countries derby
 Willi Lippens

Bibliography

References

External links
Germany-Netherlands matches 1910-2019 at RSSSF

International association football rivalries
Germany national football team rivalries
History of the Netherlands national football team
Germany–Netherlands relations
West Germany at UEFA Euro 1980
West Germany at UEFA Euro 1988
Germany at UEFA Euro 1992
Germany at UEFA Euro 2004
Germany at UEFA Euro 2012
Netherlands at UEFA Euro 1980
Netherlands at UEFA Euro 1988
Netherlands at UEFA Euro 1992
Netherlands at UEFA Euro 2004
Netherlands at UEFA Euro 2012

fr:Allemagne-Pays-Bas en football